Tony Cliss (born 22 September 1959) is an English former footballer who played as a midfielder in the Football League for Peterborough United and Crewe Alexandra.

Career
Born in March,  Cliss started his career with Peterborough United in 1977. He played his first game on 28 October 1977 in a 3-0 defeat to Colchester United. He is best remembered for a ghost goal scored against Stockport County where although a goal was awarded it had passed over the goal-line through the side netting. He moved to Crewe in 1983 before leaving professional football in 1987 to play local football on The Fens.

Post football career
After finishing playing football, Cliss became a postman.

References

1959 births
Living people
Peterborough United F.C. players
Crewe Alexandra F.C. players
Association football midfielders
English Football League players
People from March, Cambridgeshire
English footballers